Enneapterygius shaoi is a species of triplefin blenny in the genus Enneapterygius. It was described by Chiang Min-Chia and Chen I-Shiung in 2008. The specific name honours the ichthyologist and marine ecologist Kwang-Tsao Shao of the Biodiversity Research Center at the Academia Sinica in Taiwan. It occurs off the eastern and southern coast of Taiwan.

References

shaoi
Taxa named by Chiang Min-Chia
Taxa named by Chen I-Shiung
Fish described in 2008